Trouble Every Day may refer to:

"Trouble Every Day" (song) (1966) by Frank Zappa and The Mothers of Invention
Trouble Every Day (film) (2001) by Claire Denis
Trouble Every Day (soundtrack) (2001) by Tindersticks, accompanying the film